Ron Rafferty (6 May 1934 – 24 January 2021) was an English footballer who played in the Football League for Portsmouth, Grimsby Town, Hull City and Aldershot.

Rafferty died on 24 January 2021, at the age of 86.

References

External links
 

English footballers
English Football League players
1934 births
2021 deaths
Wycombe Wanderers F.C. players
Portsmouth F.C. players
Grimsby Town F.C. players
Hull City A.F.C. players
Aldershot F.C. players
Guildford City F.C. players
Association football forwards
Footballers from Newcastle upon Tyne